Gabriela Teissier Zavala (born January 18) is a journalist, news anchor and radio talk show host. She is the anchor for the early morning news formerly known as A Primera Hora on Univision's Los Angeles station KMEX-DT, and hosting Uforia Audio Network's morning radio show, Tu Voz En Los Angeles. and is known for her environmental issue reports.

Early life
Teissier was born and raised in Mexico City. She attended the German school Colegio Aleman Alexander Von Humboldt in Mexico City and then graduated from the Universidad Iberoamericana in Mexico City.

Growing up she developed a passion and interest in environmental journalism being influenced by her father, Ernesto Julio Teissier, who was a prominent political analyst in Mexico.

Teissier is the sister of Adriana Teissier Zavala, who is currently the Federal Deputy for the State of Quintana Roo, Mexico.

Career

Music

As a child, Teissier toured doing background vocals for singers such as Luis Miguel, Cristian Castro, José José and Guadalupe Pineda. She also did vocals as Terk for Phil Collins's single titled "Rompiendo el Campamento" that featured in the Spanish version of the 1999 Tarzan soundtrack.

Television
In college, she acted in television commercials and played the role of "Terk" in Spanish in the Disney movie Tarzan, Acapulco H.E.A.T. and Cinemamotion.

Her first role in news media was an anchor woman for MVS TV Noticias in Telerey, Mexico She came to the United States in the late 1990s when she was offered a job to anchor Edicion Especial Midday show on Telemundo Network. After Telemundo, worked for Univision as anchor of their midday show Escandalo TV for the launch of Unimas, formerly known as Telefutura network. She returned to California in 2003 and since then been the main anchor of the early morning news show, A Primera Hora on Univision's Los Angeles station KMEX-DT, formerly known as Primera Edicion.

Radio
Teissier is also one of the two morning radio show hosts of "Tu Voz En Los Angeles" on Univision's Los Angeles flagship talk radio station, KTNQ 1020 AM.

Achievements
She received "Best News Anchor" award from the Los Angeles Press Club and has won six local Emmy Awards including Telly awards for her anchoring, reporting, producing and writing.

Teissier received the "Excellence in Broadcast Journalism Impact Award" from the National Hispanic Media Coalition and has been recognized by the California State Senate and the City of Los Angeles for her significant contributions to the community through her stories on environmental, social and education issues.

In 2015, Teissier became an alumna of Metcalf Institute’s "Change and the News Science Seminar: Planning for Rising Seas and Extreme Weather."

In 2016, Teissier was awarded the Ohtli Award  administered by the Secretariat of Foreign Affairs.

Personal life
Teissier resides in Los Angeles with her two sons.

Philanthropy 
Teissier is currently on the board of directors for ACT Today, a non-profit organization for Autism, and on the board of trustees of the SAG-AFTRA; she previously served as a board member of the American Heart Association.

In 2020, she moderated the KPFK live stream program called “Strength Thru Unity”: Black & Brown Lives Sowing the Seed of Change to foster, inspire, and help develop collaborations between Latinos and African Americans for social justice and panelists included Dolores Huerta.

Awards 
 The National Hispanic Media Coalition, NHMC 2011 Impact Award for Excellence in Broadcast Journalism
 LA Press Club 2014 Award for Best Anchor
 Telly Award 2015 Presenter "Pasaporte al Mundial Show"
 Los Angeles area Emmy Award winning story "Cambio Climatico 101"- 2017
 Los Angeles area Emmy Award for Best Light News Story (multi-part) "Junipero Serra"- 2016
 Heal The Bay Walk The Talk Award 2018
 SPJ Distinguished Journalist for Television 2019

References

External links
 
 Twitter account
 LinkedIn account

Living people
Mexican journalists
21st-century American women writers
Journalists from California
Mass media people from California
American television news anchors
American television reporters and correspondents
Univision people
Year of birth missing (living people)
Ohtli Award winners